Bentrovata is a genus of flies belonging to the family Lesser Dung flies.

Species
B. regalis Richards, 1973

References

Sphaeroceridae
Diptera of Australasia
Sphaeroceroidea genera